is a large gas-fired power station in Kawagoe, Mie, Japan. The facility operates at an installed capacity of 4,802 MW, making it the fifth largest power station of its kind.

See also 

 List of largest power stations in the world
 List of power stations in Japan
 List of natural gas power stations

References 

Natural gas-fired power stations in Japan
Buildings and structures in Mie Prefecture
Kawagoe, Mie
1997 establishments in Japan
Energy infrastructure completed in 1997
Chubu Electric Power